Harrisburg High School is a public high school located in Harrisburg, Pennsylvania. This large urban high school is one of two public high schools operated by the Harrisburg City School District. In 2015, enrollment was reported as 1,165 pupils in 9th through 12th grades. The school employed 89 teachers.

In 2014, Harrisburg High School enrollment was reported as 1,146 pupils in 9th through 12th grades, with 81% of pupils eligible for a free lunch due to family poverty. Additionally, 29% of pupils received special education services, while 0.09% of pupils were identified as gifted. The school employed 117 teachers. According to the PA Department of Education 2% of the teachers were rated "Non‐Highly Qualified" under the federal No Child Left Behind Act. The school is a federally designated Title I school.

History
The school first opened in 1971 as a merger of John Harris High School, which opened 1926, and William Penn High School. John Harris High School now refers to a campus of Harrisburg High.

Extracurriculars
Harrisburg High School offers a wide variety of clubs, activities and an extensive, publicly funded sports program.

Harrisburg High School offers Marching Cougars Band, Concert Band, and a Jazz Ensemble. The school also offers a US Navy Junior ROTC program.

Sports
The district provides these high school sports:
Varsity

Boys
Baseball - AAAAAA
Basketball- AAAAAA
Football - AAAAAA
Soccer - AAAA
Track and Field - AAA
Wrestling - AAA

Girls
Basketball - AAAAAA
Softball - AAAAAA
Girls' Tennis - AAA
Track and Field - AAA
Volleyball - AAAA

According to PIAA directory May 2019

Notable alumni
 Cameron Artis-Payne - former NFL player
 Phil Davis (current mixed martial arts fighter for Bellator MMA)
 Charles Dudley (NBA Champion with Golden State Warriors)
 Dennis Green (NFL Head Coach)(Vikings, Cardinals)
Dan Hartman (Musician, singer, songwriter, and record producer)
 Ray Isom - former NFL player
 Rickey Isom - former NFL player
 Jimmy Jones  (Quarterback USC, CFL Champion Quarterback)
 Danny Lansanah - former NFL player
 Micah Parsons (#4 ranked High School football player, current defensive end/linebacker for Dallas Cowboys)
 Hank Poteat - former NFL player
 Adrian Robinson (NFL linebacker (Steelers, Broncos, Chargers, Redskins)
 Ed Temple (women's track and field coach at Tennessee State University and coach of many Olympians)
 Kenny Watson - former NFL player
 Jan White NFL Tight End, Buffalo Bills
 Tom Buskey MLB Pitcher

References

Public high schools in Pennsylvania
Schools in Dauphin County, Pennsylvania